The Scottish Regional Leagues are the lowest levels of the Scottish rugby union system. They consist of three regions:
West Regional Leagues
East Regional Leagues
Caledonia Regional Leagues

Unlike the Premiership, National League and parts of the League Championship, which were formed in 1973 and have remained roughly the same since, the Regional Leagues have grown over time, in a process which saw the old District Leagues amalgamated into the national structure. Up to and including season 2006–07, some divisions operated pools (where the division was split in two, with pre-Christmas and post-Christmas mini-groups) but from season 2007–08 all the divisions will be standard all-play-all formats of between 10 and 12 clubs.
 
From season 2012–13 the whole League was revamped into a pyramid structure. The 6 National Divisions were scrapped because of travel costs and lack of movement between leagues. The new leagues were:
2 national divisions – Premiership and National League
2 semi-national (West/East) – Championship Divisions A and B
3 regional leagues (East, West and Caledonia)
The Caledonia Leagues were then broken down again into Midlands, North-East and North-West for travel cost reasons. For season 2014–15, Championship divisions A & B were scrapped and two additional National League divisions were re-introduced under National League Division 1.

The champion from each league would be promoted to replace the bottom team of the corresponding division. Also two-legged play-offs were introduced at the end of each season for the 2nd placed team and 2nd bottom team of the higher league. The winner over two legs would play in the higher league the next season, meaning greater potential movement throughout the divisions.

History
Up to season 1972–73, Scotland's rugby union clubs participated in what was known as an 'unofficial championship'. It provided very unbalanced competition: some clubs played more fixtures than others and some fixture lists provided stiffer opposition than others. The resulting league table at the end of each season gave a very unbalanced and difficult-to-comprehend set of results.

Starting in season 1973–74, the Scottish Rugby Union organised the full member clubs into six leagues. Though the SRU's administrators were often seen as backward looking, Scotland had a national league before England, Wales or Ireland. Since the advent of the leagues, the Scottish Rugby Union and its member clubs have re-organised the competition several times, usually to change the number of teams.

The current Regional Leagues are based more on political than physical geography. The Caledonia region covers a much larger area and more clubs but a smaller population. The East region is made up of the City of Edinburgh, the Lothians and the Borders, traditionally the strongest rugby playing regions. The West region is based on the old Strathclyde council region, from the South-West English border, through Ayrshire, Lanarkshire, Glasgow and suburbs North to Stirlingshire. The Caledonia Region covers the whole North of Scotland from Fife and Stirling, all the way to Orkney and Eilean Siar. It is sub-divided (in leagues 2 and 3) into Midlands, North and North-West.

Tennents West Regional League 2021-2022

In League One, with the exception of Carrick the teams remained the same as the 2019-20 season, due to the covid 19 pandemic. In League Three, the Isle of Mull RFC moved to non-league status.

Caledonia Regional League, 2021–22

2nd and 3rd XVs not included.

East Regional League, 2021–22

References

 
6